Goingarijp  is a small village in De Fryske Marren municipality in the province of Friesland, the Netherlands. It had a population of around 250 in 2017.

History
The village was first mentioned in the 13th century as Godinriip, and means bank belonging to Goënga. The Protestant Church dates from 1770 and was a replacement of a medieval church. In 1840, it was home to 86 people. There is a little American wind mill near the village.

Before 2014, Goingarijp was part of the Skarsterlân municipality and before 1984 it was part of Doniawerstal.

Gallery

References

External links

De Fryske Marren
Populated places in Friesland